Olivier Delaître and Stéphane Simian were the defending champions, but did not participate together this year.  Delaître partnered Guy Forget, losing in the semifinals.  Simian did not participate this year.

Stefan Edberg and Magnus Larsson won in the final 7–6, 6–2, against Andrei Olhovskiy and Jan Siemerink.

Seeds

  Jacco Eltingh /  Paul Haarhuis (semifinals)
  Jan Apell /  Jonas Björkman (first round)
  Hendrik Jan Davids /  Menno Oosting (quarterfinals)
  Andrei Olhovskiy /  Jan Siemerink (final)

Draw

Draw

External links
Draw

1995 Qatar Open
1995 ATP Tour
Qatar Open (tennis)